José Ibarburu (21 February 1929 – 22 September 2018) was a Spanish rower. He competed in the men's eight event at the 1960 Summer Olympics.

References

1929 births
2018 deaths
Spanish male rowers
Olympic rowers of Spain
Rowers at the 1960 Summer Olympics
Sportspeople from San Sebastián
Rowers from the Basque Country (autonomous community)